"Twelve Angry Men" is a 1954 teleplay by Reginald Rose for the Studio One anthology American television series. Initially staged as a CBS live production on September 20, 1954, the drama was later rewritten for the stage in 1955 under the same title and a feature film, 12 Angry Men (1957).  The episode garnered three Emmy Awards for writer Rose, director Franklin Schaffner and Robert Cummings as Best Actor.

Plot

Act I
The program opens as a judge instructs the jury in a murder case that their verdict must be unanimous. In the jury room, an initial vote is 11 to 1 in favor of guilty. Juror #8 (Robert Cummings) is the holdout voting not guilty. Juror #3 (Franchot Tone) criticizes Juror #8 as being "out in left field." They go once around the table, each juror having an opportunity to express his point of view. Juror #10 (Edward Arnold) focuses on the neighbor who testified that she saw the defendant stab his father. Juror #7 (Paul Hartman) focuses on the defendant's record – reform school at age 15 for stealing a car, arrested for knife fighting, and he comes from slums that are breeding grounds for criminals. Juror #5 (Lee Phillips) takes offense and points out that he's lived in a slum his whole life – "maybe it still smells on me."

Juror #8 asks for the alleged murder weapon, a switch knife, to be brought into the jury room. Juror #4 points out that the shopkeeper where the defendant purchased the knife testified that it was the only one he had in stock and that it's a very strange knife. When the knife is brought into the jury room, Juror #8 pulls an identical knife from his pocket. He had purchased it the prior night at the junk shop around the corner from the defendant's house.

Juror #8 asks for a secret ballot. If there are still 11 guilty votes, Juror #8 will go along. The votes are handed in.

Act II
There are now only 10 guilty votes. Juror #9 (Joseph Sweeney) admits that he was the one who changed his vote.

Juror #8 focuses on the noise from the elevated train that passed by as the murder took place. One of the witnesses, an old man, claimed that he heard the defendant say, "I'm going to kill you," and then heard the body drop one second later. He questions how the witness could have heard these things, at a distance, with the train roaring by. Juror #5 changes his vote to not guilty. The vote is now 9–3.

Juror #8 next questions how the old man who's had a stroke and walks with two canes could have gotten up out of bed and run through his apartment to see the defendant running down the stairs.  The old man testified this happened only 15 seconds after the murder.  Juror #3 says the old man may have been confused when he said 15 seconds: "He's an old man. You saw him. Half the time he was confused. How can he be positive about anything?" Juror #3 and the others pause, reacting to the import of Juror #3's question. Juror #8 performs a reenactment to show that the old man could not have gotten up and walked that distance in 15 seconds. Juror #3 complains about Juror #8's dishonesty and says the kid's got to burn. When Juror #8 calls Juror #3 a sadist, Juror #3 lunges and threatens to kill him.

Act III
A new vote is taken. It is now 6–6. Juror #2 (John Beal) is troubled by the angle of the stab wound. Juror #5 has experience with switch blades and says they are typically used with an underhand motion, but the wound here was from an overhand motion. Another vote is taken, and it's 9–3 in favor of acquittal. Jurors 3, 4 and 10 are now the holdouts.

Juror #10 focuses on race: "How can you believe that this kid is innocent? You know how these people lie ... They don't know what the truth is ... They don't need any big reason to kill someone either ... That's the way they are ... Human life doesn't mean as much to them as it does to us ... They haven't got any feelings ....  There isn't one of them that's got any good in them." The other jurors walk away in shock at Juror #10's tirade. Juror #4 tells Juror #10 that if he opens his mouth again, Juror #4 will split his skull.

Juror #4 is still persuaded by the old lady who said she saw the defendant stab his father. One of the jurors recalls that the old lady wore glasses. She wouldn't have been wearing her glasses in bed, which is where she said she was, tossing and turning. Juror #8 says that all the old lady could have seen, without her glasses and through the train windows, was a blur. Juror #3 is left as the only guilty vote, but he finally gives in. The defendant is found not guilty.

Cast
The cast included performances by:

 Robert Cummings as Juror #8
 Franchot Tone as Juror #3
 Edward Arnold as Juror #10
 Paul Hartman as Juror #7
 John Beal as Juror #2
 Walter Abel as Juror #4
 George Voskovec as Juror #11
 Joseph Sweeney as Juror #9
 Bart Burns as Juror #6
 Norman Fell as Foreman
 Lee Phillips as Juror #5
 Will West as Juror # 12

Uncredited cast
 Vincent Gardenia as Bailiff

Betty Furness presents Westinghouse appliances in breaks after each of the acts.

Production
The production was staged in New York City and aired live on September 20, 1954, as the first episode in the seventh season of the program, Studio One.  A kinescope recording was made for rebroadcast later on the west coast.

It was written by Reginald Rose especially for Studio One. Felix Jackson was the producer and Franklin Schaffner the director. Wes Laws was the set decorator, and Willard Levitas provided the settings.

The production won three Emmy Awards: for Rose's writing, Schaffner's direction, and for Robert Cummings as Best Actor.

Reception
The performance received generally positive reviews. In 1997, Steve Rhodes wrote: "Cummings gives the best of several outstanding performances."

References

Sources
  Revised link to article retrieved April 23, 2017.
 Rose, Reginald, Twelve Angry Men, teleplay

External links
 
 

Black-and-white television episodes
Television courtroom dramas
1954 television plays
Television anthology episodes
Juries in fiction
Television shows written by Reginald Rose
Emmy Award-winning programs
Twelve Angry Men
Studio One (American TV series)
1954 American television episodes